Mount Tararua is a prominent peak, 2,550 m, surmounting the southwest part of Monteath Hills in the Victory Mountains, Victoria Land. Climbed on January 3, 1963 by the Southern Party of New Zealand Federated Mountain Clubs Antarctic Expedition (NZFMCAE) (1962–63), who named it after their parent mountain club, the Tararua Tramping Club, Wellington, New Zealand.

References

Mountains of Victoria Land
Borchgrevink Coast